SS-Sturmbannführer Karl Steubl, Steubel, or Steibel (25 October 1910 – 21 September 1945) was a Nazi, perpetrator of euthanasia programme dubbed Action T4, and commander of transportation at the Sobibór extermination camp during Operation Reinhard, the most deadly phase of the Holocaust. Arrested after the war in Europe ended, Steubl committed suicide in Linz, Austria.

Participation in atrocities
Before his last assignment at Sobibor in occupied Poland, Steubl was a senior male nurse at Schloss Hartheim, the biggest mass extermination centre outside Eastern Europe set up at Alkoven in Upper Austria. The killing program Action T4 was performed there between 1939 and 1945. Already by August 1941, long before the war's end, a grand total of 18,269 mentally and physically handicapped patients including many others, were murdered at gas chambers of Hartheim Euthanasia Centre and cremated on site in the course of his service there.

From August 1942, Steubl was one of the Austrian commanders of Sobibór extermination camp, which he also helped organize as an expert in gassing. He was present, and most likely took part in the execution of the last Jews who were sent to Sobibór for clean-up after demolition of the Treblinka extermination camp nearby.

Arrest and suicide
Arrested by the Allies, Steubl was the first of three SS men from Sobibór who committed suicide after the end of World War II in Europe. The second one was Kurt Bolender; recognized by a Holocaust survivor in Germany and arrested in 1961, Bolender committed suicide in prison before sentencing. He was accused of participating in the murder of approximately 86,000 Jews. The third one was SS-Oberscharführer Gustav Wagner ("the Beast of Sobibór"), also from Austria originally. He killed himself in 1980 after being exposed by Simon Wiesenthal in Brazil.

Notes

1910 births
1945 suicides
Aktion T4 personnel
Operation Reinhard
Sobibor extermination camp personnel
SS-Sturmbannführer
Nazis who committed suicide in Austria
Nazis who committed suicide in prison custody
Holocaust perpetrators in Poland

Holocaust perpetrators in Austria